Lieutenant William Myron MacDonald was an American-born Canadian flying ace. He was credited with eight confirmed victories during World War I while flying as a wingman to Victoria Cross winner William George Barker.

Early life
William Myron MacDonald was born in Connecticut, USA on 3 November 1890. His family moved to Vancouver, British Columbia in 1893. MacDonald was working as a marine motor engineer in Vancouver when he enlisted in the Canadian Expeditionary Force. Upon enlistment, he was a bachelor; his next of kin was Catherine MacDonald. However, as his attestation paper is missing, his actual date of enlistment is unknown; his Canadian citizenship also becomes questionable, as he is not known to have sworn allegiance to the Crown.

World War I
MacDonald began his military hitch in the motor transport segment of the Army Service Corps. He served in this mundane assignment for more than two years, most of it overseas duty. In August 1917, he was commissioned into the Royal Flying Corps. By March 1918, he was trained as a fighter pilot and posted to No. 66 Squadron in Italy as a Sopwith Camel pilot. While assigned to 66 Squadron, MacDonald flew as a wingman for William George Barker, the great Canadian ace. MacDonald was credited with destroying eight enemy airplanes between 24 May and 15 August 1918. This feat earned him the  Distinguished Flying Cross, awarded on 20 August 1918 and gazetted on 2 November 1918:

"Lt. William Myron Macdonald.

"A very gallant and determined officer, who never hesitates to attack the enemy however superior in numbers the latter may be. On a recent occasion he engaged, single-handed, five scouts, destroying two, both of which crashed. In all he has accounted for seven machines."

List of aerial victories

Post-war
On 20 April 1919, MacDonald was transferred to the unemployed list of the Royal Air Force, ending his term of service. In 1930, he was known to be living in San Diego, California. He died there on 8 May 1958.

References
 Above the Trenches: A Complete Record of the Fighter Aces and Units of the British Empire Air Forces 1915-1920. Christopher F. Shores, Norman L. R. Franks, Russell Guest. Grub Street, 1990. , .
 William Barker, VC: The Life, Death and Legend of Canada's Most Decorated War Hero. Wayne Ralph. John Wiley and Sons, 2007. , .

See also
Aerial victory standards of World War I

American World War I flying aces
Aviators from Connecticut
Recipients of the Distinguished Flying Cross (United Kingdom)
Royal Flying Corps officers
1890 births
1958 deaths
British Army personnel of World War I
Royal Army Service Corps soldiers